Drosera myriantha, the star rainbow or starry sundew, is an erect perennial tuberous species in the carnivorous plant genus Drosera. It is endemic to Western Australia and is found along the coast south of Perth to Albany. It grows in swampy areas in peaty sand soils. White or pink flowers bloom from October to December.

Drosera myriantha was first described by Jules Émile Planchon in 1848.

See also
List of Drosera species

References

Carnivorous plants of Australia
Caryophyllales of Australia
Eudicots of Western Australia
Plants described in 1848
myriantha